The 1901 Gallaudet Bison football team was an American football team that represented Gallaudet College, a school for the education of the deaf and hard of hearing located in Washington, D.C. The team competed as an independent during the 1901 college football season and compiled a 4–2–2 record, highlighted by a victory over Georgetown.  The team suffered its only losses to the Carlisle Indian Industrial School and southern champion Virginia. The scoreless tie with Baltimore Medical College was at the time described by the Deaf-Mutes Journal as the "prettiest game that has been seen in Baltimore." Ely and Rosson were the team's coaches.

The team included halfback Gilbert O. Erickson, who received first-team All-Southern honors. Other key players included halfback George Andree, fullback and team captain Horace B. Waters and quarterback Howe W. Phillips.

Schedule

References

Gallaudet
Gallaudet Bison football seasons
Gallaudet Bison football